Akron/Family II: The Cosmic Birth and Journey of Shinju TNT (sometimes spelled as Akron/Family S/T II: The Cosmic Birth and Journey of Shinju TNT) is the fifth studio album by experimental rock band Akron/Family, released on February 8, 2011, on Dead Oceans Records. This is the group's second album following the departure of founding member Ryan Vanderhoof as well as their second for Dead Oceans.

Track listing

Personnel 

Miles Seaton
Seth Olinsky
Dana Janssen

Other Credits 

Ali Beletic – vocals
Paul Gold – mastering
Chris Koltay – engineer, mixing
Tatsuya Nakatani – gong, percussion
Martin Rietze – photography
Ed Sortman – trumpet
Ryan Vanderhoof – slide guitar

References

Akron/Family albums
2011 albums
Dead Oceans albums